Clathria dayi, the broad-bladed tree sponge, is a species of demosponge. It is known from the west coast of South Africa and around Cape Point to False Bay. It is probably endemic to this region.

Description
The broad-bladed tree sponge may grow to 20 cm in height and be 2–4 cm thick. It is a massive erect sponge, having broad flat blades extending from a small stalk. It has a slightly hairy texture, but is smooth in appearance. It is bright red in colour.

Habitat
This sponge lives on rocky reefs in 15-272m of water.

References

Poecilosclerida
Sponges described in 1963